The men's hammer throw event at the 1994 World Junior Championships in Athletics was held in Lisbon, Portugal, at Estádio Universitário de Lisboa on 22 and 23 July.  A 7257g (senior implement) hammer was used.

Medalists

Results

Final
23 July

Qualifications
22 Jul

Group A

Group B

Participation
According to an unofficial count, 28 athletes from 19 countries participated in the event.

References

Hammer throw
Hammer throw at the World Athletics U20 Championships